An architectural design competition is a type of design competition in which an organization that intends on constructing a new building invites architects to submit design proposals. The winning design is usually chosen by an independent panel of design professionals and stakeholders (such as government and local representatives). This procedure is often used to generate new ideas for building design, to stimulate public debate, generate publicity for the project, and allow emerging designers the opportunity to gain exposure. Architecture competitions are often used to award commissions for public buildings: in some countries rules for tendering public building contracts stipulate some form of mandatory open architectural competition.

Winning first prize in a competition is not a guarantee that the project will be constructed. The commissioning body often has the right to veto the winning design, and both requirements and finances may change, thwarting the original intention. The 2002 World Trade Center site design competition is an example of a highly publicized competition where only the basic elements of the winning design by Daniel Libeskind appeared in the finished project.

History
Architecture competitions have a more than 2,500-year-old history. The Acropolis in Athens was a result of an architectural competition in 448 B.C., as were several cathedrals in the Middle Ages. During the Renaissance, many projects initiated by the Church have been decided through design competition. Examples are the Spanish Steps in Rome or in 1419, a competition was held to design the dome of the Florence Cathedral, which was won by Filippo Brunelleschi. Open competitions were held in the late 18th century in several countries including the United States, Great Britain, Ireland, France and Sweden.

In 19th century England and Ireland there have been over 2,500 competitions in five decades, with 362 in London alone. The Royal Institute of British Architects drafted a first set of rules in 1839 and a set of formal regulations in 1872. The German Regulations were introduced in 1867. In the same period in the Netherlands, an association for the advancement of architecture (Maatschappij tot Bevordering van de Bouwkunst), started organising conceptual competitions with the aim of stimulating architects' creativity.

Competition types
There are a variety of competition types resulting from the combination of following options:
 Open competitions (international, national or regional) or limited, selected, non-open competitions, depending on who is allowed to participate.
 Project competitions or ideas competitions: depending on the intention of building the project or generating new ideas.
 Single-stage or two-stage competitions: depending on the scale and complexity of the competition.
 Anonymous or cooperative procedures: anonymity supports greater objectivity during the evaluation and award-granting deliberations. In cooperative procedures, the authors are invited to make in-person presentations to the jury in order to explain their design strategies and allow individual discussion.
 Student design competitions.

Rules and guidelines
The rules of each competition are defined by the organiser; however, these often follow the guidelines provided by the International Union of Architects, respectively the relevant national or regional architecture organisation. Competition guidelines define roles, responsibilities, processes, and procedures within a competition and provide guidance on possible competition types, eligibility criteria, jury composition, participation conditions, payments, prizes, publication of results and other aspects.

In France and Germany design competitions are compulsory for all public buildings exceeding a certain cost.

Major international architectural design competitions

Most significant among architectural competitions are the ones which are internationally open, attract a large number of design submissions, and the winning design is built.

See also
Architectural design values
Student competition
Student design competition

References

Further reading
Andersson E., Bloxham Zettersten, G. und Rönn, M., (eds) Architectural Competitions - Histories and Practice. Stockholm: The Royal Institute of Technology and Rio Kulturkooperativ, 2013. 
Chupin, Jean-Pierre, Carmela Cucuzzella and Bechara Helal (eds) Architecture Competitions and the Production of Culture, Quality and Knowledge: An International Inquiry, Montreal: Potential Architecture Books, 2015, 
Collyer, G. Stanley, Competing Globally in Architecture Competitions, Wiley Academy, 2004, 
De Jong, Cees and Mattie, Erik: Architectural Competitions 1792-1949, Taschen, 1997,

External links

 Architectural Competition - Nordic Symposium
 Canadian Competitions Catalogue
 DesignCompetition.com, list of design competitions
 DCC Directory of Architecture and Design Competitions, Awards, Associations and Design Residencies., list of 1500 architecture and design competitions
 CABE: Making Competitions Work
 RIBA Competitions, the Royal Institute of British Architects dedicated RIBA Competitions unit
  Wettbewerbe Aktuell, a German journal specialized in architectural competitions
 Handbook of Architectural Design Competitions, American Institute of Architects (AIA)
  The Competition Project, Inc., a world-wide resource on competitions since 1990 with the periodical publication, COMPETITIONS (1991-2010) and COMPETITIONS Annual (2010-)

 
Architectural design